Orders, decorations and medals of Lebanon comprise the Order of Merit (Lebanon), and the National Order of the Cedar.